Albert Wurzer is a West German bobsledder who competed in the mid-1970s. He won two medals in the four-man event at the FIBT World Championships with a gold in 1974 and a silver in 1975.

References
Bobsleigh four-man world championship medalists since 1930

German male bobsledders
Living people
Year of birth missing (living people)